The following outline is provided as an overview of and topical guide to the Bible:

Books

Hebrew Bible

The order of these books is different in the Christian Old Testament

Torah

 Book of Genesis
 Book of Exodus
 Book of Leviticus
 Book of Numbers
 Book of Deuteronomy

Nevi'im

 Book of Joshua
 Book of Judges
 Books of Samuel
 Books of Kings

 Major prophet
 Book of Isaiah
 Book of Jeremiah
 Book of Ezekiel

 Twelve Minor Prophets
 Book of Hosea
 Book of Joel
 Book of Amos
 Book of Obadiah
 Book of Jonah
 Book of Micah
 Book of Nahum
 Book of Habakkuk
 Book of Zephaniah
 Book of Haggai
 Book of Zechariah
 Book of Malachi

Ketuvim

 Psalms
 Book of Proverbs
 Book of Job
 Song of Songs
 Book of Ruth
 Book of Lamentations
 Ecclesiastes
 Book of Esther
 Book of Daniel
 Book of Ezra
 Book of Nehemiah
 Books of Chronicles

Deuterocanon

 Book of Tobit
 Book of Judith
 Additions to Esther (Vulgate Esther 10:4–16:24)
 Book of Wisdom (also called the Wisdom of Solomon)
 Sirach (also called Ecclesiasticus)
 Book of Baruch, including the Letter of Jeremiah (Additions to Jeremiah in the Septuagint)
 Additions to Daniel:
 Prayer of Azariah and Song of the Three Holy Children (Vulgate Daniel 3:24–90)
 Susanna (Vulgate Daniel 13, Septuagint prologue)
 Bel and the Dragon (Vulgate Daniel 14, Septuagint epilogue)
 1 Maccabees
 2 Maccabees

New Testament

Gospel

 Gospel of Matthew
 Gospel of Mark
 Gospel of Luke
 Gospel of John

Acts of the Apostles
 Acts of the Apostles

Epistles

Pauline epistles

 Epistle to the Romans
 First Epistle to the Corinthians
 Second Epistle to the Corinthians
 Epistle to the Galatians
 Epistle to the Ephesians
 Epistle to the Philippians
 Epistle to the Colossians
 First Epistle to the Thessalonians
 Second Epistle to the Thessalonians

Pastoral epistles

 First Epistle to Timothy
 Second Epistle to Timothy
 Epistle to Titus
 Epistle to Philemon

General epistles

 Epistle to the Hebrews
 Epistle of James
 First Epistle of Peter
 Second Epistle of Peter
 First Epistle of John
 Second Epistle of John
 Third Epistle of John
 Epistle of Jude

Revelation
 Book of Revelation

Versions 
 Bible translations
 Bible translations into English
 List of English Bible translations
 Gothic Bible
 King James Bible
 Luther Bible
 Masoretic Text
 Novum Testamentum Graece
 Septuagint
 Vetus Latina
 Vulgate

Languages 
 Biblical Aramaic
 Biblical Hebrew
 Koine Greek

History

Development 
 Biblical canon
 Development of the Hebrew Bible canon
 Development of the Old Testament canon
 Development of the New Testament canon

Authorship 
 Authorship of the Bible
 Mosaic authorship
 Authorship of the Pauline epistles
 Authorship of the Johannine works
 Authorship of the Petrine epistles

Ethics 
 Ethics in the Bible
 Alcohol in the Bible
 The Bible and humor
 The Bible and violence
 Capital punishment in the Bible
 Rape in the Hebrew Bible
 Warfare in the Hebrew Bible
 The Bible and slavery
 Sex in the Hebrew Bible
 The Bible and homosexuality
 Incest in the Bible
 Rape in the Hebrew Bible
 Women in the Bible

General concepts

Interpretation
 Biblical hermeneutics
 Pesher
 Midrash
 Pardes
 Allegorical interpretation
 Biblical literalism
 Bible prophecy

Studies 
 Biblical studies
 Dating the Bible
 The Bible and history
 Biblical archaeology
 Biblical archaeology school
 Biblical criticism
 Higher criticism
 Textual criticism
 Canonical criticism
 Categories of New Testament manuscripts
 Documentary hypothesis
 Internal consistency of the Bible
 List of biblical figures identified in extra-biblical sources
 List of biblical places
 List of biblical names
 Synoptic Gospels

Content 
 :Category:Bible content
 :Category:New Testament content
 :Category:Bible chapters
 :Category:Biblical people
 :Category:Biblical phrases
 :Category:Biblical topics
 :Category:Bible verses

Works based on the Bible 
 :Category:Works based on the Bible
 :Category:Biblical art
 :Category:Biblical comics
 :Category:Biblical poetry
 :Category:Films based on the Bible
 :Category:Games based on the Bible
 :Category:Music based on the Bible
 :Category:Musicals based on the Bible
 :Category:Novels based on the Bible
 :Category:Operas based on the Bible
 :Category:Plays based on the Bible
 :Category:Television shows based on the Bible
 :Category:Video games based on the Bible

The Bible in Mormonism 
 Bible Dictionary (LDS Church)
 Book of Mormon and the King James Bible
 Joseph Smith Translation of the Bible
 LDS edition of the Bible
 Standard works

See also 

 Biblical and Quranic narratives
 List of Bible verses not included in modern translations
 List of biblical commentaries
 List of biblical figures identified in extra-biblical sources
 List of biblical place names in North America
 List of burial places of biblical figures
 List of Chinese Bible translations
 List of English Bible translations
 List of Hebrew Bible events
 List of Hebrew Bible manuscripts
 List of Jewish biblical figures
 List of languages by year of first Bible translation
 List of major biblical figures
 List of minor biblical figures
 List of minor biblical places
 List of minor biblical tribes
 List of Moody Bible Institute people
 List of names for the biblical nameless
 List of people in both the Bible and the Quran
 Outline of the Book of Mormon

References

External links 

 Bible Videos from the Church of Jesus Christ of Latter-day Saints.

 
Bible
Bible